Domps is a commune in the Haute-Vienne department in the Nouvelle-Aquitaine region in western France. The writer and Resistant Jean Blanzat (1906–1977) was born in Domps.

Inhabitants are known as Dompsois and Dompsoises in French.

See also
Communes of the Haute-Vienne department

References

Communes of Haute-Vienne